Gowsaweyne, Gawsa Weyne is a village in the Sool region of Somaliland. It is located in the Aynabo District.

History
In August 2013, several people were killed in fighting between the Cismaan Iidle and Sacadyoonis clans near Gowsaweyne.

In January 2014, at least four members of the Sa'ad Yonis clan were killed by the Jama Siyad clan in fighting near Gowsaweyne. Ceasefire brokered by a Somaliland government minister and others at the end of August.

In June 2014, the road connecting Oog and Garadag was completed, and a representative from Gowsaweyne attended the opening ceremony.

In October 2017, voter registration was conducted by the Somaliland Electoral Commission, with a combined total of 900 people registered in the two constituencies established in Gowsaweyne.

In January 2018, officials from Garadag District visited Gowsaweyne to audit the progress of a project funded by UNICEF and the Norwegian Refugee Council.

In April 2021, a storm hit some areas including Gowsaweyne.

See also

References

Gowsaweyne 

Populated places in Sool, Somaliland